Barbara Sharma (born September 14, 1938, Dallas) is an American actress and dancer of the night clubs, stage, television, and film. She began dancing at age 4 and professionally at age 9, dancing in nightclubs in Miami and Havana, Cuba.  As a dancer she had a close working relationship with Bob Fosse, working as a lead dancer in his company for five seasons. She is best known for creating roles in the Original Broadway productions of several prominent musicals during the 1960s, including Rosie in Sweet Charity and Mary in Hallelujah, Baby!, and as a regular performer on Rowan & Martin's Laugh-In from 1970-1972. She also portrayed Shelley Sealy as a main cast member of the short lived TV series Glitter in 1984-1985, and performed the recurring roles of Mrs. Recinos on Becker, Mrs. Douglas on Frasier, Amanda Wilkerson on Chico and the Man, and Myrna Morgenstein in Rhoda. She frequently appeared in commercials from the 1950s to the 2000s, including commercials for Folgers, Glass Plus, and State Farm.

Career
Sharma began her career at the age of 9 in Miami and Havana, Cuba, and nightclubs across the states.  Her hoofing came well before her tap-dancing.  
She began her Off-Broadway career at the age of 19 starring in the lead role of "Little Mary Sunshine" in the original production of Rick Besoyan's In Your Hat in 1957 after spending a summer performing at Camp Tamiment. She initially came to prominence on the Broadway stage in the 1960s in the original casts of Little Me, Hello, Dolly!, Sweet Charity (as Rosie), Hallelujah, Baby! (as Mary), and Come Summer (as Emma Faucett). Much of her work can be heard on the original cast albums for those shows. She later appeared on Broadway as Bobbi Michele in Last of the Red Hot Lovers in 1970 and Cleo in I Love My Wife in 1979.

In 1970, Sharma replaced Bernadette Peters in the New York production of Dames at Sea and continued with the show for its entire run in Los Angeles. Her performance in the show drew the attention of producer George Schlatter and led to her big break in television; landing her a part in the main cast of Rowan & Martin's Laugh-In from 1970 to 1972. She portrayed Shelley Sealy on Glitter and was a member of the cast of the PBS anthology series Masquerade. 

Sharma's other TV appearances include the recurring roles of Mrs. Recinos in Becker, Mrs. Douglas in Frasier, Amanda Wilkerson in Chico and the Man, and Myrna Morgenstein in Rhoda in addition to guest appearances on Alice, Amazing Stories, Hart to Hart, Insight, Muddling Through, One Day at a Time, Perfect Strangers, Shadow Chasers, Tabitha, The David Frost Show, The Mike Douglas Show, The Facts of Life, The Mary Tyler Moore Show, and two episodes of The Tonight Show Starring Johnny Carson. She was a recurring panelist on the game show Match Game during the 1970s, and in 1973, she starred opposite Bernadette Peters in the ABC  musical comedy special Break Up. In 1984, she portrayed Shelley Sealy as a main cast member of the short-lived TV series Glitter. Film credits include Con Air, My Stepmother Is an Alien, Norman... Is That You?, and Time Share.

References

External links

1938 births
Living people
Actresses from Dallas
American musical theatre actresses
American stage actresses
American television actresses
20th-century American actresses
21st-century American actresses